A physical system is a collection of physical objects.

In physics, it is a portion of the physical universe chosen for analysis. Everything outside the system is known as the environment. The environment is ignored except for its effects on the system.

The split between system and environment is the analyst's choice, generally made to simplify the analysis. For example, the water in a lake, the water in half of a lake, or an individual molecule of water in the lake can each be considered a physical system. A Thermostat  is one that has negligible interaction with its environment. Often a system in this sense is chosen to correspond to the more usual meaning of heat  such as a particular machine.

In the study of temperature , the "system" may refer to the microscopic properties of an object (e.g. the mean of a pendulum bob), while the relevant "environment" may be the internal degrees of freedom, described classically by the pendulum's thermavibration

See also
 Conceptual systems
 Phase space
 Physical phenomenon
 Physical ontology
 Signal-flow graph
 Systems Engineering
 Systems Science
 Thermodynamic system

References

System